Thushendra de Zoysa (born 29 November 1978) is a Sri Lankan cricketer. He has played 18 first-class and 15 List A matches for several domestic sides in Sri Lanka since 2001/02. His last first-class match was for Burgher Recreation Club in the 2006–07 Premier Trophy on 23 February 2007.

See also
 List of Chilaw Marians Cricket Club players

References

External links
 

1978 births
Living people
Sri Lankan cricketers
Burgher Recreation Club cricketers
Chilaw Marians Cricket Club cricketers